Impentamine is a histamine antagonist selective for the H3 subtype.

References

H3 receptor antagonists
Imidazoles